The Hedebo Greenway (Danish: Hedebostien) is an under-construction footpath and cycleway which will run from Roskilde Fjord at Roskilde to the Bay of Køge in the western and southern part of metropolitan Copenhagen, Denmark.

"The Hedebo Greenway – from inlet to bay" is developed as a collaboration between Roskilde, Greve and Solrød municipalities with economic support from the Nordea Foundation. A number of fitness stations as well as interpretive boards with information on cultural and natural sites will be placed along the route.

Route
 Vindinge Nature Playground, Vindinge
 Tune Hallerne, Tune
 Karlstrup Nyskov
  Karlstrup and Engstrup moser 
 Køge Bugt Strandpark

See also
 Copenhagen Super Bikeways
 Hedeland

References

External links
 Official website

Cycleways in Denmark
Walking in Denmark
Greenways
Roskilde Municipality
Greve Municipality
Solrød Municipality